Among the Lombards, the duke or dux was the man who acted as political and military commander of a set of "military families" (the Fara), irrespective of any territorial appropriation.

Etymology
The proper Lombardic language term for the figure of the duke is not known; the oldest Lombard historiographical sources (the anonymous Origo gentis Langobardorum and Historia Langobardorum of Paul Deacon) were written in Latin. The Latin word dux was adopted to designate a political and military figure that had no exact equivalent in the classical world, thus redefining the concept of "duke" in a form that would continue to develop in later centuries.

History
The figure of the Duke emerged between the 4th and 5th centuries, after the German people settled between the Elbe and the current northern Bohemia. At that time the Lombards were nomads, forming homogeneous groups and compact families originating from the same noble clan, and able to organize themselves into quotas with military functions: the Fare. The Dukes were the leaders of the Fare. In that office they were honored as warriors for the dynastic ties and their valor shown in war, and later rewarded by the king. The figure of the Lombard Duke encompassed a mixture of military, noble, sacral (invested by the king, attended his "charisma"), political, judicial and administrative elements. In the assembly of the people in arms ("Gairethinx"), the dukes had a prominent role, and were decisive in the election of the king.

Once in Italy, the ducal institution gradually became linked with the territory, but always subordinate to the political-military status of the Duke. Since the first city conquered by Alboin in 568, Cividale, a duke was appointed in any militarily significant urban center, with a mandate to lead the Lombards warriors settled in nearby areas "in Fara" against any enemy threats. From that first settlement, however, the ducal institution had a dual character: on the one hand, the Duke was a commander of an army, on the other, he was the head of a fraction of the people ( "gens"), and therefore subject to the expectations and traditions (management of power, military activity, division of wealth) of the people themselves. The Duke was thus given a royal investiture and a political-military nature, but at the same time also carried a unique power as a guarantor of a particular social structure (that of the Fara). These coexisting but contradictory factors characterize the Lombard Kingdom, in constant tension between the centralizing impulses of sovereign power and aspirations for autonomy of the Dukes; over the centuries a transition was seen from greater ducal independence (so that for the ten years of the so-called Rule of the Dukes, 574 to 584, they  ruled as absolute monarchs in their seats) to a growing assertion of central power, although their aspirations for autonomy were not completely settled.

The Lombard duchies, both in Langobardia Maior and Langobardia Minor, were not abolished with the fall in the realm in 774, and were later incorporated into the Carolingian Empire. The only exception, the Duchy of Benevento, was soon elevated to the rank of principality (though weakened by secessions), retaining its autonomy and indeed playing an important political role until the arrival of the Normans in the 11th century. With the defeat of the Lombard kingdom by the Franks of Charlemagne, the figure of the Lombard Duke was replaced by the Frankish count; however, the Duchy of Benevento remained outside the Carolingian Empire, and  maintained a substantial degree of autonomy.

List of Lombard duchies
 Duchy of Friuli
 Duchy of Ceneda
 Duchy of Treviso
 Duchy of Vicenza
 Duchy of Verona
 Duchy of Trent
 Duchy of Parma
 Duchy of Reggio
 Duchy of Piacenza
 Duchy of Brescia
 Duchy of Bergamo
 Duchy of San Giulio
 Duchy of Pavia
 Duchy of Turin
 Duchy of Asti
 Duchy of Tuscany
 Duchy of Spoleto
 Duchy of Benevento, after 774 the Principality of Benevento; later the Principalities of Salerno and Capua gained independence from it
 Duchy of Aosta
 Duchy of Milan
 Duchy of Ivrea
Duchy of Persiceta

See also
Duke (Lombard)
Fara (Lombard)
Lombards
Lombard Kingdom

References

Sources
Paul Deacon, Historia Langobardorum (Storia dei Longobardi, Lorenzo Valla/Mondadori, Milan 1992)

Bibliography
Lidia Capo. Comment to 
 
 Jörg Jarnut, Storia dei Longobardi, Turin, Einaudi, 2002. 
 Sergio Rovagnati, I Longobardi, Milan, Xenia, 2003. 

Lombards
Early Germanic law